Huzurabad is a town in the Huzurabad mandal of Karimnagar district in the Indian state of Telangana. It is a municipality in the district.

Huzurabad is an educational hub and has general hospital services for nearby towns and villages. The Government High School and Government Junior College have playgrounds and interstate competitions are often held in this town.

The best known landmarks in the town are Super Bazaar Road, Old Super Bazaar (jewellery bazaar), DCMS Complex, Hanuman Temple, Karimnagar Road Petrol Bunk, Warangal Road Petrol Bunk, Nataraj Theatre, Annapurna Theatre, the bus depot, K C Camp, Ranganayakula Gutta, Patimedhi Anjaneya Swami Temple and the Government Hospital.

Model Cheruvu is the biggest Cheruvu in Huzurabad town and is going to become a reservoir.

Geography 

Demographics 
In the 2011 census, Huzurabad had a population of 37,665 (19,208 males and 18,457 females — a sex ratio of 961 females per 1000 males). 3,140 children were in the age group of 0–6 years. The average literacy rate was 75.72% with 26,141 literates.

Government and politics 
Huzurabad Nagar Panchayat was constituted in 2011 and has 20 election wards. In 2019, it became a municipality.

Transport 
Huzurabad is well connected by road. State run TSRTC buses operates from Huzurabad bus depot to various cities and towns of the state and to surrounding rural areas.

Noatble people
The former prime minister, P. V. Narasimha Rao, studied here in the  Government Boys' High School.

References 

Mandal headquarters in Karimnagar district
Cities and towns in Karimnagar district